The Moldovan Liga 2 is the third-level division of Moldovan Football. There are 26 teams in the competition, and they are divided into two groups, the North group and the South group.

Champions

Top Goalscoarers

Performance by club

 
3
Third level football leagues in Europe